= The Newton Graphic =

Weekly newspaper published in Massachusetts

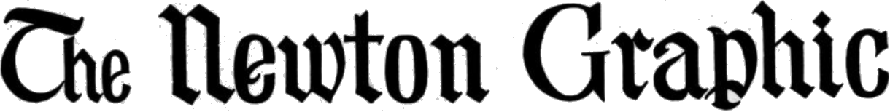
- Type: Weekly newspaper
- Founded: October 21, 1882
- Language: English
- Ceased publication: September 4, 1997
- Headquarters: Waltham, Massachusetts
- ISSN: 0739-3849
- OCLC number: 9729501

The Newton Graphic was a weekly newspaper, published in Massachusetts from 1882 to 1997.
